Stars & Stripes Forever is the eighth album from The Nitty Gritty Dirt Band.

Track listing
[some material was recorded with audience and friends at Woodland Studio's, Nashville, Tennessee]

"Jambalaya (On the Bayou)" (Hank Williams) – 1:43
"Dirt Band Interview" – 3:39
"Cosmic Cowboy (Part 1)" (Michael Martin Murphey) – 3:21
"Aluminum Record Award / Jeff Hanna – 1:31
"Fish Song" (Jimmie Fadden) – 3:50
"Mr. Bojangles" (Jerry Jeff Walker) – 3:46
"Vassar Clements Interview" – 3:56
"Listen to the Mockingbird" (Arranged & Adapt. by Millie Clements) – 2:47
"The Sheik of Araby" (Harry Beasley Smith, Ted Snyder, Francis Wheeler) – 2:08
"Resign Yourself to Me" (Casey Kelly) – 2:40
"Dixie Hoedown" (Jesse McReynolds, Jim McReynolds) – 2:27
"Cripple Creek" (Arr. & Adapt. by Millie Clements) – :54
"The Mountain Whippoorwill (or, How Hillbilly Jim Won the Great Fiddler's Prize" (Stephen V. Benet, Arranged & Adapt William McEuen) – 7:07
"Honky Tonkin'" (Hank Williams) – 2:00
"House at Pooh Corner" (Kenny Loggins) – 2:54
"Buy for Me the Rain" (Greg Copeland, Steve Noonan) – 2:32
"Oh Boy" (Sonny West, Bill Tilghman, Norman Petty) – 2:50
"Teardrops in my Eyes" (Tommy Sutton, Red Allen) – 2:11
"Glocoat-Blues" (Jimmie Fadden) – 3:11
"Stars and Stripes Forever" (Arranged & Adapt. by Jeff Hanna) – :38
"The Battle of New Orleans" (Jimmie Driftwood) – 2:58
"It Came From The 50s (Blast From The Past) / Jeff Hanna" (Jeff Hanna) – 6:45
"My True Story" (Eugene Pitt, Oscar Waltzer) – 3:08
"Diggy Liggy Lo" (J. D. Miller) – 3:52

Charts

Personnel
Jimmie Fadden
Jeff Hanna
Jim Ibbotson
John McEuen

Special Guest Artists
Vassar Clements
Doug Journigan
Les Thompson

Production
Producer - William E. McEuen

References
All information is from the album liner notes, unless otherwise noted.

Nitty Gritty Dirt Band albums
1974 albums
United Artists Records albums